Sony α (the lower case to Greek letter alpha, often transliterated as Sony Alpha) is a digital camera system introduced on 5 June 2006. It uses and expands upon Konica Minolta camera technologies, including the Minolta AF SLR lens mount, whose assets were acquired by Sony after the end of Konica Minolta's photography operations in early 2006. Sony also has an 11.08% ownership stake in Japanese lens manufacturer Tamron, which is known to have partnered with Konica Minolta and Sony in the design and manufacture of many zoom lenses.

Prior to the acquisition by Sony, the α branding had already been used on the Japanese market by Minolta for their AF camera system (marketed as "Dynax" in Europe, and "Maxxum" in North America). Sony adopted the name "A-mount system" for the Minolta AF lens mount, which has been retained in their new SLR range.

Sony's entry into the DSLR market dates back to July 2005 where a joint venture with Konica Minolta would have resulted in both companies marketing an updated line of DSLRs to consumers. Between 2006 and 2008 Sony was the fastest growing company on the DSLR market, reaching 13% market share in 2008 to become the third largest DSLR company in the world.

In May 2010, Sony introduced two α NEX mirrorless interchangeable lens cameras equipped with the new proprietary Sony E-mount.
A-mount lenses can be used in E-mount cameras with an adapter - four different adapters are available from Sony alone.

Sony announced plans to introduce a special camera service programme for professional photographers since the launch of the α900 in 2008. Sony Imaging PRO Support (a.k.a. SPS) was finally established starting between 2013 and 2015 depending on country.

Camera bodies

The Sony α model system works on the principle that the next model up in the series has additional features to the one below; for example the α330 has the features of the base model α230 but with a tilt-angle LCD and Quick AF Live View, while the α380 has the settings and features of the α330 but increased resolution of 14.2 megapixels.

Only a few Sony APS-C DSLRs have Live View, except for the Sony α100, α200, α230, α290, α700, α850 and α900 series. Live View mode features a 1.4x or 2x Smart Teleconverter which digitally zooms in on the subject and reproduces pixels on a 1:1 basis, preventing degradation of picture quality.

In 2010 Sony replaced the legacy DSLR design with SLT cameras, where the "SLT" stands for "single-lens translucent" which refers to a fixed beam splitter in the image path. Sony SLT can shoot movie files at Full HD 1080p AVCHD with continuous phase detection autofocus.

Along with the α33 and α55 cameras, Sony also announced one of the last Sony DSLRs - the α560 which can also shoot movie files at full HD stereo 1080p AVCHD, but with limited manual controls and no continuous AF. These three cameras use the same technology Sony Exmor APS HD CMOS sensor.  The α33 and α55 are SLT based (fixed translucent mirrors) and can take movie files with continuous Auto Focus, whereas DSLRs using reflex mirrors typically cannot, at least not without limitations.

A-mount lenses

The A-mount, originally known as the A-type bayonet mount was introduced by Minolta in 1985 as the world's first fully integrated SLR autofocus system.  As a result, all Minolta A-mount lenses can be used on Sony DSLRs (except for that some newer camera features cannot be used), and all Sony A-mount lenses work on Minolta's film and digital SLRs (except for that SSM/SAM lenses can be used only with manual focusing on cameras not supporting SSM and that APS-C format lenses cannot reasonably be used on film cameras due to their smaller image circle). During the initial introduction of the α system in 2006, Sony announced 19 lenses and 2 tele-converters, of which the majority were rebranded Konica Minolta lenses. At the 2007 PMA trade show, Sony unveiled several new lenses, but referred to them only in qualitative terms and did not provide specifications.

On 18 May 2009, Sony introduced the first A-mount lenses to feature their new SAM (Smooth Auto-focus Motor) in-lens auto-focus motor for more lens-specific AF speed improvements. This introduction was made with the new "+30" series camera bodies (α350 + 30 = α380). These new bodies retain an in-body focus motor for backward compatibility with the historic lens collection. In addition, the new bodies utilize HDMI output for display on HDTV sets and feature dual memory card slots for both Sony's proprietary Memory Stick Pro Duo chips as well as SDHC media format, while eliminating CompactFlash support.

E-mount lenses

In 2010 Sony added the E-mount system to their Sony α lineup. This includes mirrorless cameras as well as camcorders. First they were all called "NEX", but this name has been dropped for "ILCE" for the mirrorless stills cameras.

Other accessories

Flash system

The 4-pin iISO flash shoe (also known as the Auto-lock Accessory Shoe) on all Sony DSLRs/SLTs and some NEX models up to 2012-08 was introduced by Minolta in 1988 for their Maxxum/Dynax/α series of A-mount AF SLRs and was also used on their digital DiMAGE A cameras series. It offers a slide-on auto-locking mechanism but is mechanically incompatible with hotshoes based on the ISO 518 standard as utilized by most other camera and accessory manufacturers. A compatible 7-pin variant existed as well, but was rarely used by Minolta, and not at all by Sony. The passive adapters Minolta FS-1100 and FS-PC allow to adapt Minolta AF and TTL flashes with ISO-based foot to cameras with Auto-lock Accessory Shoe, whereas the FS-1200 allows users to use AF TTL flashes with Auto-lock Accessory Foot on earlier Minolta SLRs. These adapters provide no voltage protection or galvanic isolation, but they maintain TTL support with Minolta film cameras. Digital cameras, however, require digital-ready flashes for TTL support. If no TTL support, but voltage protection and galvanic isolation is required, the Sony FA-HS1AM can be used instead to mount ISO-based equipment on Auto-lock Accessory Shoe cameras. If no electrical connection is required, the mechanical adapter Sony FA-SA1AM can be used as well.

In 2012-09 Sony introduced a new 21+3-pin ISO-518 compatible hotshoe called Multi Interface Shoe, replacing the Auto-lock Accessory Shoe, previously used with α equipment. The adapter ADP-MAA adapts existing 4-pin auto-lock foot flashes to cameras with the new Multi Interface Shoe, whereas the adapter ADP-AMA allows photographers to use some new equipment with Multi Interface shoe on older cameras with Auto-lock Accessory Shoe.

The first two flash models released by Sony (HVL-F36AM and HVL-F56AM) are, like the first generation of lenses, rebadged models of the Minolta Program Flash 3600HS(D) and the Minolta Program Flash 5600HS(D). Later on Sony expanded its flash system further, allowing advanced wireless flash control, including grouping of external flashes into groups with full ratio control.

The HVL-RLAM and HVL-RL1 are ring-shaped LED continuous lights for use with video. To a limited extent they can also be used for macro photos of static objects, although a true macro flash is much preferred. The Sony flash system does not include a ring flash, but the Minolta R-1200 and 1200 AF ring flash heads can be used with the Minolta Macro Flash Controller MFC-1000 on Sony DSLRs as well, whereas the older Minolta Control Unit 1200 AF is not compatible with digital cameras. The MFC-1000 also accepts the Minolta Twin Flash T-2400 as well as the flash head of the Sony HVL-MT24AM twin flash, but not vice versa.

Vertical control grips 

Vertical control grips were released for a number of α DSLRs and MILCs, with the exception of most recent entry-level DSLRs: α230, α330, α380, α290 and α390. The new α65 will also get no vertical grip. All the vertical grips are sold separately.

Other

References

External links

Dyxum.com, a website for α photographers

Lens mounts
 
 
Cameras introduced in 2006
Japanese inventions